The women's artistic team all-around competition at the 2008 Summer Olympics was held at the Beijing National Indoor Stadium on August 13, 2008.

Teams qualified through the general artistic qualification performances. Each team was composed of six gymnasts. Five of those gymnasts performed on each of the four apparatus, and four of those scores counted towards the team total. The eight teams with the best combined scores in the qualification moved on to the team final.

In the team final, each team selected three gymnasts to compete on each apparatus. All three scores counted for the team score; the three scores on each apparatus were summed to give a final team score.

Qualified teams

The eight teams with the highest scores in qualifying proceed to the women's artistic team finals.

Final

References

Gymnastics at the 2008 Summer Olympics
2008
Olympics
2008 in women's gymnastics
Women's events at the 2008 Summer Olympics